Judaism and environmentalism intersect on many levels. The natural world plays a central role in Jewish law, literature, and liturgical and other practices. Within the arena of Jewish thought, beliefs vary widely about the human relation to the environment.

Jewish law and the environment 
In Jewish law (halakhah), ecological concerns are reflected in Biblical protection for fruit trees, rules in the Mishnah against harming the public domain, Talmudic debate over noise and smoke damages, and contemporary responsa on agricultural pollution. In Conservative Judaism, a new initiative has adopted ecokashrut ideas begun in the 1970s. In addition, Jewish activists have recruited principles of halakhah for environmental purposes, such as the injunction against unnecessary destruction, known as bal tashkhit. The rule of tza'ar ba'alei hayyim is a restriction on cruelty to animals. Some prophetic traditions speak of societal moral decadence causing an environmental disaster.

Other Jewish beliefs about the environment
Generally speaking, the Bible and rabbinic tradition have put Judaism primarily on an anthropocentric trajectory, but creation-centered or eco-centric interpretations of Judaism can also be found throughout Jewish history, many theologians regard the land as a primary partner of Jewish covenant, and Judaism and especially the practices described in the Torah may be regarded as the expression of a fully indigenous and land- or earth-centered tradition. In Genesis, too, God instructs humanity to hold dominion over nature, but this may be interpreted in terms of stewardship as well. Eco-centric discussions of Judaism can be found in the work of such modern scholars and rabbis as Arthur Green, Arthur Waskow, Eilon Schwartz, Lynn Gottlieb, Mike Comins, Ellen Bernstein, and David Mevorach Seidenberg.

Jewish environmentalism 

The Jewish environmental movement has developed tracks in North America and in Israel. In North America it was in many ways motivated by the revival of back-to-the-land values in the sixties and seventies. However, whereas for the majority of the counter-culture movement these values were an expression of 1960's radicalism, for Jews there was the additional and powerful influence of Zionist idealism, which since its inception also emphasized returning to the land. Especially after the 1967 Arab-Israeli war, which generated a huge outpouring of sympathy and identification with Israel among unaffiliated Jews, the motif of return to the land became a bridge that connected progressive Jewish activists with the Jewish community from which they were often estranged. In Israel various initiatives, movements, and thinkers, like the JNF, the kibbutz movement, and Ahad Ha'am, may be seen as forerunners of Jewish environmentalism, though those these trends were not always in line with an explicitly Jewish environmentalist understanding.

The pioneers of environmentalism in the North American Jewish community were often deeply committed to vegetarianism. (This trend can still be found in newer organizations like the Shamayim Va'aretz Institute and Farm Forward. ) Notable among the early innovators is Richard Schwartz, who published Judaism and Vegetarianism in 1982, followed by Judaism and Global Survival in 1984.

As with most things Jewish, a large part of Jewish environmental work has consisted of investing Jewish practice with ecological meaning through sermons, teachings, and books. Two early writers were Eric Freudenstein and Rabbi Everett Gendler, who also influenced a great many activists and teachers during this period through his teaching and his farming. Rabbi Arthur Waskow has been one of the leaders in this area of exploration, starting with his 1982 work The Seasons of Our Joy: A Modern Guide to the Jewish Holidays, which follows the liturgical calendar through the changes in the earth. (Waskow's work was part of a trend now called Jewish Renewal, which involved uniting values associated with 1960s or New Age spiritual countercultures with Jewish practice.) In the same year, David Ehrenfeld and Rabbi Gerry Serotta at Rutgers University organized the first-ever Jewish Environmental Conference. In 1983, Waskow founded the Shalom Center, which over time turned its energy from nuclear weapons to the environment. The Shalom Center is now one of the primary organizations in North America and the world that promulgates an activist ecological understanding of Judaism.

In 1988, Shomrei Adamah ("Guardians of the Earth") was formed as the first national Jewish organization devoted to environmental issues. Founded by Ellen Bernstein in Philadelphia, Shomrei Adamah produced guides to Judaism and the environment such as Let the Earth Teach You Torah (1992), which was one of the works that initiated the field of Jewish environmental education. Shomrei Adamah captured the imaginations of environmentally concerned Jews around North America and quickly supplanted groups such as L'OLAM in New York City on the national level. However, even as regional groups like Shomrei Adamah of Greater Washington, DC (founded in 1990) sprung up to do grassroots organizing, the national organization pulled away from involvement with regional groups. Later, other regional groups like the Northwest Jewish Environmental Project in Seattle (NWJEP or NJEP), founded in 1997, took a decidedly different approach. While Jewish identification with the earth and Jewish environmental activism had gone hand-in-hand up until then, these new groups focused on making nature a source of Jewish identity and explicitly de-emphasized political activism. The roots of this approach can be traced back to Jewish hiking groups and to the national network of such groups, Mosaic Outdoor Clubs of America (founded in 1988).

In 1993, The Coalition on the Environment and Jewish Life (COEJL) was formed to bring the Jewish environmental movement into the mainstream. COEJL filled the vacuum left by Shomrei Adamah, working with other religion-based groups under the umbrella of the National Religious Partnership for the Environment (NRPE) to achieve these goals. Unlike earlier groups, which were created by activists or organizational entrepreneurs, COEJL was founded by three institutions: The Jewish Theological Seminary (of the Conservative movement), the Religious Action Center (the lobbying arm of the Reform movement), and the Jewish Council for Public Affairs (previously the National Jewish Relations Advisory Council), the national umbrella for the Jewish Community Relations Councils that can be found in most metropolitan areas. Jewish environmentalists are drawn from all branches of religious life, ranging from Rabbi Arthur Waskow's organization The Shalom Center to the Orthodox educational group Canfei Nesharim.

The newer generation of Jewish environmental organizations, including especially the farming and food movement, can be traced to the Teva Learning Center, now called the Teva Learning Alliance, which was founded in 1994 by Amy Meltzer and Adam Berman at Camp Isabella Freedman in Connecticut to offer outdoor education experiences to Jewish day schools. Teva's initial curriculum drew on resources developed by Camp Tawonga, located in the California redwoods. Teva has long been a flagship of Jewish environmentalism, which now embraces numerous organizations and activities. The Adamah Farming Fellowship was also founded in 2003 at IF (now called the Isabella Freedman Retreat Center) by Shamu Sadeh, an alumnus educator of the Teva program. In the past few years, Jewish environmental consciousness has poured itself into the farming movement, sparked by Adamah, and the food movement, focalized by Hazon.

Hazon itself was founded by Nigel Savage in 2000 with an inaugural bike ride across North America to raise money for Jewish environmental causes in North America and Israel. Hazon has expanded greatly since then, and has nurtured through conferences and incubation grants the Jewish food movement and the campaign to bring awareness of the Sabbatical year to the Jewish community throughout the world. Other efforts include neohasid.org, founded by Rabbi David Seidenberg in 2005, Wilderness Torah, founded by Zelig Golden in 2009, and Eden Village Camp, which was first envisioned by Yoni and Vivian Stadlin in 2006 and which opened in 2010. The Kayam Farm at Pearlstone, founded 2006, organized an annual conference on Jewish agricultural law. In 2013, Hazon, already the largest Jewish environmental organization in North America, merged with Isabella Freedman. Along with the proliferation of farming programs in North America, and a network of Jewish-community-based CSAs organized by Hazon, there has also been a movement to bring shechitah, kosher slaughter, back to the small farm, using humanely- and sustainably-raised animals. Grow and Behold Foods (founded 2010) is the largest commercial purveyor of such meat. There is also wide interest in a kosher certification that would guarantee food is produced in an ethical manner. In 2014, Hazon took over Isabella Freedman Retreat Center. 

In Israel, many governmental and non-governmental organizations, both secular and religiously oriented, exist to protect nature and to advocate for environmental issues and for environmental awareness. The Heschel Center for Environmental Learning and Leadership, and the Reform movement's Kibbutz Lotan, both founded in 1983, have had a long and lasting impact. In 2001, the Green Zionist Alliance, now called Aytzim, was founded as the first environmental organization to ever participate the World Zionist Organization and its constituent agencies. Aytzim works from North America to educate and mobilize Jews around the world for Israel's environment and to support Israel's environmental movement. From 2003 through 2008, Rabbi Carmi Wisemon together with the Ramat Shlomo Community Council, the Israeli Ministry of the Environment and the Municipality of Jerusalem produced four journals called the Environment in Jewish Thought and Law, on the intersection between Halacha (Jewish law) and environmentalism written by Orthodox rabbinic scholars. Notable recent developments include Teva Ivri, founded in 2009 by Einat Kramer, which led the Shmita Yisraelit movement and project, the Interfaith Center for Sustainable Development, founded in Jerusalem in 2010 by Rabbi Yonatan Neril, and Shorashim/Roots, a peace group founded in 2014 in the West Bank by both settlers and Palestinians that focuses on land issues.

Jewish practices and liturgy 
In contemporary Jewish liturgy, ecological concerns have been especially promoted by adapting the kabbalistic ritual of conducting a seder for the New Year of the trees, Tu Bishvat. Biblical and rabbinic texts have also been enlisted for prayers about the environment in all the liberal movements, especially in Reform Judaism and Jewish Renewal movements.

Perhaps most emblematic of the nexus of Judaism and the environment is the growth of the primary Jewish environmental event to which most Jews have been exposed, the aforementioned Tu biSh'vat seder, often labeled "Jewish Earth Day" and sometimes called tongue-in-cheek "Tree B'Earthday". Falling in the early spring two full moons before Passover, Tu biSh'vat ("the 15th of the month of Sh'vat") generally coincides with the first sap rising in the fruit trees in the land of Israel. Because in rabbinic Judaism this day was labeled the "New Year for the Tree," 17th century mystics created a ritual meal or seder of fruit and nuts for the day that celebrated the "Tree of Life" that sustains the universe. The Jewish National Fund (JNF) applied these motifs to in the 1950s to championing Tu biSh'vat as a day for planting trees in the land of Israel.

The history of the seder also sheds light on the development of the Jewish environmental movement. One of the early moments of awakening to environmental issues in the Jewish community came when rabbis and Jewish activists drew on the symbolism of the Jewish National Fund campaigns to create the "Trees for Vietnam" reforestation campaign in 1971 in response to the use of Agent Orange by the US. In 1976, Jonathan Wolf in New York City created and led one of the first modern environmental seders, incorporating liturgy from the Kabbalists with information from Israeli environmental groups like Neot Kedumim ("Ancient Fields," a conservancy group devoted to Biblical species), and Society for the Protection of Nature in Israel (SPNI).

By the late-1970s, Jewish groups around the country were innovating rituals for Tu biSh'vat that connected Biblical and rabbinic teachings with material from the Kibbutz movement or JNF and with current environmental concerns. In the 1980s dozens of homemade Tu biSh'vat liturgical books or haggadot modeled after the Passover seder were being used around the country to celebrate trees and to talk about local and national environmental issues, the earth and ecology.

See also
Derech HaTeva
Environmental issues
Green Zionism
Jewish Veg
Jewish vegetarianism
Spiritual ecology
Stewardship (theology)
Earth stewardship

References

Bibliography 

Alexander Barzel. Matsaʻ u-matsav: ʻiyunim bi-tefisat ha-ṭevaʻ ba-maḥashavah ha-Yehudit Sifriyat "Helal Ben-Ḥayim". Tel-Aviv: Ha-Ḳibuts Ha-Meʼuḥad, 2004.
Jeremy Benstein. The way into Judaism and the environment Woodstock, Vt.: Jewish Lights Pub., 2006. ; 978-1-58023-268-5.
Anita Bernstein. Formed by Thalidomide: Mass Torts as a False Cure For Toxic Exposure Columbia Law Review, November, 1997
Ellen Bernstein. The splendor of creation: a biblical ecology. Cleveland: Pilgrim Press, 2005. .
Ellen Bernstein. Ecology & the Jewish spirit: where nature and the sacred meet Woodstock, Vt.: Jewish Lights Pub., 1998. .
Ellen Bernstein and Dan Fink. Let the earth teach you Torah : a guide to teaching Jewish ecological wisdom Wyncote, PA: Shomrei Adamah, 1992. .
Matt Biers-Ariel, Deborah Newbrun and Michal Fox Smart. Spirit in nature : teaching Judaism and ecology on the trail Springfield, NJ: Behrman House, 2000. .
J. J. Boersema. Thora en stoa over mens en natuur : een bijdrage aan het milieudebat over duurzaamheid en kwaliteit Baarn: Callenbach, 1997. .
Chaya M. Burstein. The kids' catalog of animals and the earth. Philadelphia, PA: The Jewish Publication Society, 2006. .
Jeremy Cohen. "Be Fertile and Increase, Fill the Earth and Master It": The Ancient and Medieval Career of a Biblical Text. Ithaca, NY: Cornell University Press, 1989.
Mike Comins. A Wild Faith: Jewish Ways Into Wilderness, Wilderness Ways Into Judaism Woodstock VT: Jewish Lights Publishing, 2007.
Molly Cone and Roy Doty. Listen to the trees : Jews and the earth New York: UAHC Press, 1995. .
Irene Diamond and David Mevorach Seidenberg. "Sensuous Minds and the Possibility of a Jewish Ecofeminist Practice." Ethics and the Environment 4:2 (2000), 185-95; repr. as "Recovering the Sensuous through Jewish Ecofeminist Practice." In Arthur Waskow, ed. Torah of the Earth v.2, Woodstock VT: Jewish Lights Publishing, 2000, 245-260.
Ari Elon, Naomi M. Hyman and Arthur Ocean Waskow. Trees, earth, and Torah: a Tu b'Shvat anthology. Philadelphia: Jewish Publication Society, 2000. .
Eric G.Freudenstein. "Ecology and the Jewish Tradition." Judaism 19:4 (1970), 406–14; repr. in Milton R. Konvitz, ed. Judaism and Human Rights. New York: W. W. Norton, 1972, 265-74; and Marc Swetlitz, ed. Judaism and Ecology. Philadelphia, PA: Shomrei Adamah, 1990, 29-33.
Manfred Gerstenfeld. Judaism, environmentalism, and the environment: mapping and analysis Jerusalem: Jerusalem Institute for Israel Studies : Rubin Mass, 1998.
Robert Gordis. "Ecology in the Jewish Tradition" Midstream 28: Aug-Sep (1982), 202-21; repr. in Judaic Ethics for a Lawless World. New York: JTS, 1986; and Marc Swetlitz, ed. Judaism and Ecology. Philadelphia, PA: Shomrei Adamah, 1990, 47-52.
Arthur Green. Seek My Face, Speak My Name. New York: Jason Aronson, 1994.
Hadassah and Shomrei Adamah. Judaism and ecology: a Hadassah study guide in cooperation with Shomrei Adamah, Keepers of the Earth New York, NY: Dept. of Jewish Education, Hadassah, 1993.
Daniel Hillel. The natural history of the Bible: an environmental exploration of the Hebrew scriptures New York: Columbia University Press, 2006. .
Aloys Hüttermann. The ecological message of the Torah : knowledge, concepts, and laws which made survival in a land of "milk and honey" possible South Florida studies in the history of Judaism. 199, Atlanta, Ga.: Scholars Press, 1999. .
Ronald H. Isaacs. The Jewish sourcebook on the environment and ecology Northvale, NJ: Jason Aronson, 1998. .
Eric Katz, "Faith, God, and Nature: Judaism and Deep Ecology" in Deep Ecology and World Religions: New Essays on Sacred Grounds, eds. David Landis Barnhill, Roger S. Gottlieb (Albany NY: SUNY Press, 2001), 155–61.
David Krantz. "Jewish Energy Guide". New York, NY: Green Zionist Alliance and Coalition on the Environment and Jewish Life, 2014. 
Neal Loevinger, "Judaism, the Bible and Environmental Awareness" (York University, MA thesis, 1993), 36–7, 47–8.
Merkaz ha-Yerushalmi le-ʻinyene tsibur u-medinah and Center for Jewish Community Studies. Jewish environmental perspectives'.' Philadelphia, PA: Center for Jewish Community Studies, 2001.
Naḥum Raḳover. Environmental protection: a Jewish perspective. Policy study. 4, Jerusalem: Institute of the World Jewish Congress, 1996.
Eduardo Rauch et al., eds. Special issues on ecology of The Melton Journal 24 and 25 (1991 & 1992).
Aubrey Rose. Judaism and ecology. World religions and ecology. London, England ; New York, NY, USA: Cassell, 1992. .
Or N. Rose, Jo Ellen Green Kaiser and Margie Klein. Righteous indignation: a Jewish call for justice Woodstock, Vt.: Jewish Lights Pub., 2007. ; 1-58023-336-8.
Lillian Ross. The Judaic roots of ecology Miami, Fla. 4200 Biscayne Blvd., Miami 33137: Central Agency for Jewish Education, 1983.
Yiśraʼel Rozenson. Ṿe-Hineh ṭov Meʼod. ha-Sidrah ha-yeruḳah. 2, Yerushalayim: Yeshivat "Bet Orot", 2001.
Daṿid Salomon and Meʼir Zikhl. Ekhut ha-sevivah (eḳologyah) bi-meḳorot ha-Yahadut. Ramat-Gan: Proyeḳṭ ha-sh. u-t. be-Universiṭat Bar-Ilan, 1989.
Earl Schwartz, Barry D. Cytron.  Who renews creation. (Meḥadesh be-khol yom tamid maʻaśeh ve-reshit) New York, N.Y.: National Youth Commission, United Synagogue of Conservative Judaism, 1993.
Eilon Schwartz. "Bal Tashchit: A Jewish Environmental Precept" in Environmental Ethics 18 (Winter 1997): 355–74 (repr. in Trees, Earth, and Torah, 83–106).
Eilon Schwartz. "Judaism and Nature: Theological and Moral Issues to Consider While Renegotiating a Jewish Relationship to the Natural World" in Judaism 44:4 (1985): 437–47, reprinted in Waskow, Torah of the Earth, vol.2 (see n.22) and Judaism and Environmental Ethics, ed. Martin Yaffe (Lanham MD: Lexington Books, 2001), 297–308.
Richard H. Schwartz Judaism and Global Survival, first published in 1984, 2nd edition by Lantern Books, New York, 2002. 
David Mevorach Seidenberg. Kabbalah and Ecology: God's Image in the More-Than-Human World. New York: Cambridge University Press, 2015.
Tsevi Shinover and Yitsḥaḳ Goldberg. Ekhut ha-ḥayim ṿeha-sevivah bi-meḳorot ha-Yahadut. Neḥalim: Hotsaʼat "Mofet", 1993.
Nosson Slifkin. Seasons of life: the reflection of the Jewish year in the natural world. Torah universe. Southfield, MI; Nanuet, NY: Targum Press in conjunction with Mishnas Rishonim; Distributed by Feldheim, 1998. .
 Ora R. Sheinson. Lessons from the Jewish Law of Property Rights for the Modern American Takings Debate Columbia Journal of Environmental Law,  2001
 Ruth Sonshine, Jonathan Reiss, Daniel Pollack, Karen R. Cavanaugh. "Liability For Environmental Damage : An American And Jewish Legal Perspective," Temple Environmental Law & Technology, Fall, 2000
David E. Stein. A Garden of Choice Fruit: 200 Classic Jewish Quotes on Human Beings and the Environment Wyncote, Pa.: Shomrei Adamah, 1991. . (Link is to the first edition.)
Hava Tirosh-Samuelson, "Judaism", in The Oxford Handbook of Religion and Ecology, ed. Roger S. Gottlieb (New York: Oxford University Press, 2006).
Hava Tirosh-Samuelson. Judaism and ecology: created world and revealed word. Religions of the world and ecology. Cambridge, Mass: Center for the Study of World Religions, Harvard Divinity School, 2002. ; 0-945454-36-8.
Albert Vorspan and David Saperstein. Jewish dimensions of social justice : tough moral choices of our time New York, NY: UAHC Press, 1998. .
Arthur Ocean Waskow. Torah of the earth: exploring 4,000 years of ecology in Jewish thought Two volumes. Woodstock, Vt.: Jewish Lights Pub., 2000. ; 1-58023-087-3.
Tony Watling. Ecological Imaginations in the World Religions: An Ethnographic Analysis, London and New York: Continuum International Publishers, 2009.
Carmi Wisemon. "The Environment in Jewish Thought and Law, Volumes I-IV, Sviva Israel, Beit Shemesh 2004-2008
Martin D. Yaffe. Judaism and environmental ethics: a reader Lanham, Md.: Lexington Books, 2001. ; 0-7391-0118-8.

Curricula and teaching resources
Food for Thought: Hazon's Sourcebook on Jews, Food & Contemporary Life
David Seidenberg, neohasid.org. "The Rainbow Day Curriculum to Celebrate the Rainbow Covenant"
The Hazon Shmita Sourcebook
Noam Dolgin. Elijah's Covenant Between the Generations- Climate Change Curriculum for Grades 7 - 11, published by the Shalom Center.
Noam Dolgin. Whole School Environmental Curriculum- Varied environmental instant lessons for Grades 1 - 8, published by Torah Aura.
 Nigel Savage & Anna Stevenson. Food for Thought: Hazon's Sourcebook on Jews, Food & Contemporary Life''- Sourcebook on Jewish Food Ethics, published by Hazon.
Jewcology — a broad collection of resources and curricula from many contributors throughout the Jewish environmental movement

External links
A History of Jewish Environmentalism in North America - David Seidenberg, Encyclopedia of Religion and Nature (2005)
Coalition On the Environmental and Jewish Life
Hazon
neohasid.org
Aytzim
Sviva Israel
Radio Interview with Rabbi Daniel B. Fink: Judaism and the Environment, University of Toronto, November 2008.
Wilderness Torah